Giacomo Zappacosta (born 21 April 1988) is an Italian footballer who plays as a midfielder for Brindisi FC.

Club career

Pescara
Born in Chieti, Abruzzo, Zappacosta started his professional career at Pescara. He climbed from Allievi Nazionali under-17 team (2003–05), Berretti under-18 team (2005–06), to the Primavera under-20 team in 2006, where he spent with the reserve team (the Primavera) until January 2008.  He also played a few times for the first team since the last few rounds of 2006–07 Serie B season.

In January 2008 he was sold to Fiorentina in co-ownership deal for €275,000, (plus minor cost about €20,000) where he spent half season in its reserve (the Primavera team). In July 2008 he left for Pro Patria. In June 2009 Pescara bought back Zappacosta for €67,000. Zappacosta played 17 times in 2009–10 Lega Pro Prima Divisione, winning the promotion playoffs. However, he did not made any appearances in 2010–11 Serie B.

Barletta
In January 2011 he left for Barletta. Despite only played 7 times in the second half of season, Barletta excised the option to sign Zappacosta in another co-ownership deal on 27 May, for a peppercorn fee of €250. In June 2012 Pescara gave up the remain 50% registration rights for free.

In the summer of 2012, he joined Lega Pro Prima Divisione side Lecce in temporary deal following their relegation from the Serie A and subsequent expulsion from the Serie B. On 2 June 2013 he had an anterior cruciate ligament injury during the promotion playoffs against Virtus Entella.

On 28 August 2013 he was released from his contract.

L'Aquila & Catanzaro
In summer 2014 he was signed by L'Aquila. On 21 January 2015 he was signed by Catanzaro.

Martina & Lupa Roma
He played at Martina and Lupa Roma.

Lumezzane
Zappacosta joined Lumezzane on 14 January 2017 with Francesco Rapisarda moved to opposite direction.

Serie D
He played in the lower italian series at Brindisi, Rotonda and Nardò.

International career
Zappacosta capped for the Italy U-20 Lega Pro team in 2007–09 International Challenge Trophy. He also played in 2008–09 Mirop Cup against Croatia twice.

References

External links
 Barletta Profile  
 Football.it Profile 
 
 

Italian footballers
Serie B players
Serie C players
Serie D players
Delfino Pescara 1936 players
Aurora Pro Patria 1919 players
A.S.D. Barletta 1922 players
U.S. Lecce players
L'Aquila Calcio 1927 players
U.S. Catanzaro 1929 players
A.S. Martina Franca 1947 players
Lupa Roma F.C. players
A.S. Sambenedettese players
F.C. Lumezzane V.G.Z. A.S.D. players
Association football midfielders
Sportspeople from Chieti
1988 births
Living people
Footballers from Abruzzo